Karl Gottfried Maeser  (January 16, 1828 – February 15, 1901) was a prominent Utah educator and a member of the Church of Jesus Christ of Latter-day Saints (LDS Church). He served 16 years as principal of Brigham Young Academy. Although he was not the first principal of the Academy, he is considered its founder. The Academy later became Brigham Young University (BYU) in 1903.

Before teaching at the Academy, Maeser taught at several different schools in Germany and in Utah. He tutored Brigham Young's children. Maeser incorporated the Monitorial System into his teaching philosophies and believed that students should each have responsibilities. Maeser was influenced by Pestalozzian educational theory, but also advocated that schools should include religion.

Maeser served as a missionary for the LDS Church in four nations and held many leadership positions in the church, including serving as the head of the Church Educational System and in the central leadership of the Sunday School. His educational philosophies shaped Brigham Young Academy and other church academies throughout Utah. He represented the church at the Mid-Winter Fair in San Francisco, distributing information about Utah and the church's schools.

Early life

Karl G. Maeser was born on January 16, 1828, in the town of Vorbrücke (which later became part of neighboring Meissen) in the Kingdom of Saxony to Johann Gottfried and Federicka Zocher Maeser. Maeser was the oldest of four sons. His family was well known in Meissen. His father was a china painter in a porcelain shop. Maeser went to public school in Meissen. He temporarily lost his sight for eight months when he was 11 years old due to an unknown cause.

In 1842, Maeser enrolled in the Kreuzschule in Dresden; he attended for two years, and graduating from the Kreuzschule could have propelled him into the German upper class. However, Maeser chose to study at Friedrichstadt Schullehrerseminar in Dresden, a school to train prospective teachers. He graduated on May 20, 1848. Maeser became a schoolteacher and tutored Protestant children in Bohemia for three years.  He returned to Dresden and was a teacher at the First District School in Dresden. He later taught at the Budich Institute, where he was made Oberlehrer (Senior Teacher).

In December 1848, Maeser was required to enlist in the military for a two-year assignment; however, he was declared "unfit." Maeser had no major physical or mental disabilities that would have impacted his conscription. On June 11, 1854, Maeser married Anna Mieth, the daughter of the director of the First District school in Dresden. The couple had their first child, Reinhard, in 1855. They had eight children together.

Membership in the LDS Church

Conversion
While teaching at the Budich Institute, Maeser came across Die Mormonen, an anti-Mormon book, by Moritz Busch. He and Edward Schoenfield, Maeser's brother-in-law and fellow teacher, decided to investigate the beliefs and practices of the LDS Church. Maeser wrote letters to church missionaries; missionary William Budge volunteered to go to Maeser's home to teach him and answer his questions. Both Maeser and Schoenfield joined the LDS Church. Maeser was baptized by Franklin D. Richards on October 14, 1855, in the Elbe River. Maeser was baptized at night because the church was banned in Germany at that time. Maeser was the first Latter-day Saint baptized in Saxony. His wife, Anna, was baptized shortly after on October 19. The following Sunday, a new branch of the church was established in Dresden, and Maeser became the first president. He and his family were forced to leave Germany by the Dresden police in July 1856, and would eventually travel to Salt Lake City, where Latter-day Saints were gathering.

Missionary service
After being exiled from Germany, the Maesers went to London in June 1856, where they were welcomed by members of the LDS Church. Maeser was called by the church to serve a German-speaking mission in London in July 1856.  He and his family left London in May 1857; their ship arrived in Philadelphia in July. The Maeser's infant son, Karl Gustav Franklin Maeser, died as they arrived and was buried in Philadelphia.

In Philadelphia, Maeser was commissioned by the church to develop pamphlets on basic church principles. After living there a few weeks, Maeser was called to serve as a missionary by the LDS Church to the German-speaking community of Philadelphia. Maeser spent some time in Virginia as part of his mission, where he earned keep for himself and his family by giving music lessons. Among Maeser's music students were the daughters of former United States President John Tyler. Maeser returned with Anna to Philadelphia, where he was called by the church to serve as conference president. Maeser and his family left Philadelphia in June 1860 and traveled across the country to Salt Lake City in Patriarch John Smith's company. Maeser arrived in Utah Territory on September 1, 1860.

In 1860, Maeser was appointed by church leaders in the area to head church meetings in Salt Lake City held in German. However, shortly after, most of the Swiss Church members moved to Santa Clara, Utah, and other locations in southern or central Utah, so the meetings in Salt Lake City ended. He was called to serve a mission to Germany and Switzerland in 1867. On his way to Switzerland with Octave Ursenbach they organized a branch of the Church in Paris. and appointed mission president in 1868. He founded the church magazine, Der Stern, in January 1869. Upon his return to Utah in 1870, there were enough German-speaking church members in Salt Lake City for them to hold their own church meetings again, and Maeser presided at their meetings. In 1875, Maeser took a plural wife, Emilie Damke. He was arrested for "unlawful cohabitation" and was charged with a $300 fine in 1884.

Career

Maeser accepted his first teaching position in the First District School in Dresden from 1852 to 1853, and he taught at the Budich Institute beginning in 1854. Maeser continued his teaching career when he arrived in Utah. He taught at the Deseret Lyceum, an academy established in Salt Lake City in November 1860. The teachers at the Lyceum constructed school slates and performed janitor duties because conditions were so poor. When students' families could not afford to pay tuition, Maeser often collected payments of produce via wheelbarrow.

In the spring of 1861, Maeser left the Lyceum and was offered a position at the Union Academy, established by Brigham Young. This academy was intended for students above elementary grades. Young appointed Maeser head of the school in February 1861. Maeser was concerned about the school systems meeting the needs and interests of its students, and he left the Union Academy to teach in other schools and seminaries, including the Twentieth Ward Seminary, which he founded in 1862. The school became a well-known training school for teachers.

Maeser was elected as the regent of the University of Deseret in 1860, 1863 and in 1865. In 1865, he began to privately tutor Young's fifty-six children and also instructed other children who came to the Young household including Ellis Reynolds Shipp. During this time, he also kept books for Leonard H. Hardy to supplement his income. He was teaching at Young's family school when he was called on a mission to Germany in 1867. He left for Europe in May 1867, leaving his family in a poor financial state.

Maeser returned to Salt Lake City in 1870 and became a professor of German. However, he resigned from this position to return to the Twentieth Ward Seminary. In 1870, he also taught at the University of Deseret, helping to develop their teacher training program. Maeser wrote articles in the Beehive Series of the Juvenile Instructor during 1870. In 1871, he was elected the president of the Salt Lake Teacher's Association. For a short period of time he was also an assistant organist for the Mormon Tabernacle Choir.

Brigham Young Academy
In 1875, Brigham Young Academy in Provo, Utah, was founded to combine secular and religious teachings. The Academy followed advice from Joseph Smith: to teach correct principles and to let students govern themselves. Warren Dusenberry served as its interim principal during the school's first "experimental" term until Maeser was selected to be the founding principal by Brigham Young. The Academy later became Brigham Young University.

When Maeser arrived at Brigham Young Academy in 1876, during the school's "second experimental" term, enrollment had declined since Dusenberry had started the school. The facilities were run down, there was no record system, and the school lacked a uniform schedule. Only 29 students enrolled at the beginning of Maeser's first term, but this number doubled by the end of the term. He was the only teacher during this first term. Maeser agreed to teach for only $1200 per year. The first year of his administration was divided into four terms. Maeser wrote up reports at the end of each term and sent them directly to the general authorities of the church in Salt Lake outlining lesson plans and classes.

Under Maeser's administration, the school was divided into different departments based on the ability of students. The lower divisions included the Primary, Preparatory, Intermediate, and Kindergarten departments. Primary students were ages 6 to 8 and had never attended school before. The Primary classes were replaced by the Preparatory Department in 1888. This department consisted of classes beginning with a fourth-grade reading level. The Intermediate Department was for students ages eight to eleven and accepted students graduating from the Primary Department. The higher divisions of the Academy included the Academic Department and the Normal School. The Academic Department offered a wide variety of classes and allowed a student to specialize in one field, and the Normal School trained teachers. Maeser personally oversaw the Normal School. In addition, Maeser established a daily routine. Opening exercises began at 9 a.m. and classes began at 9:30 a.m. Students were allowed 30 minutes for lunch. The school day ended at either 4 or 5 p.m. Over 3,000 different students enrolled at the Academy while Maeser was its principal.

Maeser was very strict, and students that attended the Academy had to adhere to a standard of moral conduct. Students were required to follow the Word of Wisdom. However, they were accountable for their own actions under the honor system. Maeser also established training courses for teachers. He also kept parents informed and sent monthly reports to them on the progress of their children.

In 1884, the Lewis building, where the academy first met, burned down. Reed Smoot, a former student of Maeser's approached him and said, "Dr. Maeser, the academy is no more." Maeser responded "no such thing, it's only the building . ... The academy lives on." Maeser turned the devastating fire into a lesson on pride. He had a dream that inspired the construction of new buildings for the Academy. The school struggled financially for some time, and Maeser pondered going elsewhere. He had a dream, or what he called a vision, in which he saw "Temple Hill filled with buildings—great temples of learning," which inspired him to stay at the Academy.

Maeser had a profound effect on his students. One of them, Alice Louise Reynolds, wrote that "he had the ability to inspire. He made his students feel the worth of life; he told us that the Lord had sent each of us to do a special work, and that the proper preparation was necessary for that mission." Among the students who studied under Maeser were George Sutherland, William H. King, Bryant S. Hinckley, James E. Talmage, George Albert Smith and J. Golden Kimball. He also inspired his family members; one of his sons, Karl Emil, studied under Maeser and went on to be a respected educator and school president. Maeser retired from Brigham Young Academy in 1892 to devote his time to his position as the Superintendent of Church Schools. He was succeeded by Benjamin Cluff.

Shortly before his death, Maeser was invited to speak at the anniversary of the founders day at the Maeser School, a public school named after him. He wrote his message on four chalkboards which stated:

These chalkboards are preserved at Brigham Young University.

Superintendent of the Church Educational System
In April 1888, the Church Board of Education was created as part of the LDS Church, inspired by a proposal made by Maeser in 1887. Maeser was made a member of the board, and was later appointed the superintendent of the Church Educational System. The Board of Education was created to maintain and supervise church schools. This position later became the Commissioner of Church Education. As Superintendent, Maeser helped establish initial policies for new academies established by the church. He also helped train teachers, and gave suggestions on the architecture of new school designs. By 1889, Maeser oversaw 19 schools that operated under the academy system. In 1889, Church Board of Education established a board of examiners to certify teachers. The board awarded Maeser a Doctor of Letters and Didactics degree that same year. Maeser also continued writing in the Juvenile Instructor in the 1890s to clarify church educational policies.

During this same time Maeser served in the General Superintendency of the Deseret Sunday School Union. He was the Second Assistant to General Superintendent George Q. Cannon from July 1894 to January 1899. He then served as the First Assistant to Cannon from January 1899 until February 1901. Maeser also participated in the Utah constitutional convention after Abraham Smoot's death in 1895. He proposed an article to support prohibition, but later backed down.

Mid-winter Fair in San Francisco
Missionaries from the LDS Church were removed from California in 1858 due to the Utah War. Missionary work resumed in 1892. Maeser presided over the California mission from January to August 1894 when he was replaced by Henry S. Tanner as president.

Maeser's primary responsibility was to head the Utah exhibit at the Mid-winter Fair in San Francisco in 1894, while he was serving as Superintendent of Church Schools. The exposition was patterned after Chicago World's Fair of 1893. At the Chicago exhibit, the church had displayed minerals and produce from Utah. In the San Francisco exhibit, Maeser chose to focus more on beliefs of the church and educational accomplishments of students in the church school systems. The church had an exhibit in the Manufacturers and Liberal Arts Building, and Maeser gave a series of lectures to bring more publicity to the church school exhibit. Utah's participation in the exhibit attempted to gain favor for its becoming a state. He and his companions helped distribute information about the history of Utah. No one was baptized into the church while Maeser was president of the mission; however, he did help create friendlier public-relations between Utah and California.

Educational philosophies
Maeser opposed educational philosophies of John Locke, who argued that education was for the elite only. Maeser recognized that Johann Bernhard Basedow had good ideas about treating students with kindness and removing physical punishment from the classroom; however, Maeser believed that "come, follow me" and not "thou shalt" were the best principles for teaching. In Maeser's eyes, Basedow was not a good example.

Monitorial system

Maeser included the Monitorial System from Andrew Bell and Joseph Lancaster in his teacher training courses. This system suggested that more advanced students monitored the less advanced students and that the layout of a classroom should allow one teacher to oversee a large number of students. Maeser believed that this system was flawed, however, because it focused on developing efficiency and disregarded individuality. Maeser argued that the teacher have more personal interactions with students. He implemented his monitorial organization so that each student would be responsible for something or someone else. Students were forced to look outside themselves, creating responsibility and organization.

Pestalozzian educational theory
While attending the Friedrichstadt Teacher College, Maeser was exposed to Pestalozzian educational theory, which greatly influenced his educational philosophy. Pestalozzian educational theory recognizes the potential of each individual. Pestalozzi encouraged teachers to treat their students with kindness and respect, and to show love to their students, instead of evoking fear. Pestalozzi was also in favor of universal education and opposed separately educating different social classes. Maeser adopted many of his ideas. He supported the education of women. Maeser believed that students should be allowed to express themselves freely and choose their own careers. His lectures tried to engage students and help them understand concepts through their own experiences. He also included many object lessons to coach students to observe their surroundings and make connections. Maeser admired Prestalozzian teachers Adolph Diesterweg and Friedrich Fröbel Maeser also agreed that "education should be balanced head, heart and hand."

Role of religion
Maeser believed that religion played a key role in true education. He viewed each student as a child of God that had an individual capacity and potential. He thought that all schools should adhere to some religious aspect. He also argued that public high schools should be supplemented by religion classes. Maeser, however, was respectful of other religious denominations although Brigham Young Academy and Brigham Young University integrated beliefs from the LDS Church.

Legacy

Maeser's health had been declining, although he continued working. Maeser died in his home on February 15, 1901. He was an example of dedication and faithfulness. His ideas on educational philosophy, the honor system, and incorporation of religious classes continue to be implemented at Brigham Young University, where the Maeser Building is named after him.

A song was written in Maeser's memory, "Come, Lay His Books and Papers By". The words were written by Annie Pike Greenwood and the music by L. D. Edwards. This song became an LDS hymn and appeared in the 1948 edition of the church's hymnal as hymn number 338. After the title, it states, "In memory of Dr. Karl G. Maeser." It is not included in the 1985 hymnal.

Maeser also inspired a relationship between Meissen, where he was born, and Provo, Utah. Now, the two cities share a sister-city relationship. It is the hope of both cities that the relationship will grow to include the exchange of delegations, including manufacturers, youth, academicians, scientists, artists, associations, clubs, tourists, technicians and others, which will result in enriching the cultures of the respective cities. As of 2001, the two cities have been sending high school age students on a three-week-long exchange to gain more knowledge about their differences in society and culture.

A public charter high school named Karl G. Maeser Preparatory Academy was established in Lindon, Utah, in 2007. The school emphasizes the use of the classics as well as a Socratic-style format for class discussions.

References

Further reading
Maeser, Karl Gottfried. School and Fireside. Skelton (1898), 358 pages. ASIN: B000882GWY
Maeser, Reinhard. Karl G. Maeser: A biography by his son. Brigham Young University (1928), 184 pages. ASIN: B000893U14

External links 

Utah History Encyclopedia
Maeser, BYU Presidents
Karl G. Maeser Articles

Archival materials
Archival materials related to Karl G. Maeser at L. Tom Perry Special Collections, Harold B. Lee Library, Brigham Young University

1828 births
1901 deaths
19th-century Mormon missionaries
Brigham Young Academy faculty
Burials at Salt Lake City Cemetery
Commissioners of Church Education (LDS Church)
Converts to Mormonism
Counselors in the General Presidency of the Sunday School (LDS Church)
Editors of Latter Day Saint publications
German emigrants to the United States
German leaders of the Church of Jesus Christ of Latter-day Saints
German Mormon missionaries
Latter Day Saints from Utah
Mission presidents (LDS Church)
Mormon missionaries in Germany
Mormon missionaries in Switzerland
Mormon missionaries in the United States
Mormon pioneers
Tabernacle Choir organists
People educated at the Kreuzschule
People from Meissen
Presidents of Brigham Young University
19th-century classical musicians
Harold B. Lee Library-related University Archives articles